David Michael Winter,  (born 10 November 1955) is an expert on rural politics and economics.

Early life
He was born in Launceston, Cornwall in 1955, the son of David Winter (d.1989) a farmer and lecturer and his wife Jeanne Nanette. His early life was spent firstly in Devon, where the family farmed near Beaworthy before moving to Hampshire where his father lectured at Sparsholt College. He was educated at Peter Symonds College then at Wye College, Kent. He received a PhD from the Open University in 1988.

Career
He is Director of the Centre for Rural Policy Research at the University of Exeter, UK. He is also a board member of the Commission for Rural Communities, formerly the Countryside Agency, and was formerly a member of the Governing Body of IGER (The Institute for Grassland and Environment Research). His other previous roles have included being Chair of the South West Rural Affairs Forum, a member of the Government's Inquiry into fox hunting, President of the Devon Rural Network, Vice-Chair of the Hatherleigh Area Project and Chair of Exbourne C of E Primary School Governors. In May 2008, Prof. Winter was made a Lay canon of Exeter Cathedral, Devon by Michael Langrish the Bishop of Exeter along with Dr. John Rea.

Works

 Rural Politics: Policies for Agriculture, forestry and the Environment.

References 

 Professor Michael Winter - Politics - University of Exeter

1955 births
Living people
Academics of the University of Exeter
Officers of the Order of the British Empire
People from Launceston, Cornwall
People educated at Peter Symonds College
Alumni of the Open University
Alumni of Wye College